The 2014 Quebec Scotties Tournament of Hearts, the provincial women's curling championship for Quebec, was held from January 13 to 19 at the Belvedere Sports Club in Val-d'Or. The winning team of Allison Ross will represent Quebec for the second consecutive year at the 2014 Scotties Tournament of Hearts in her hometown of Montreal.

Teams
The teams are listed as follows:

Round-robin standings
Final round-robin standings

Round-robin results

Draw 1
Monday, January 13, 12:00

Draw 2
Monday, January 13, 19:30

Draw 3
Tuesday, January 14, 15:45

Draw 4
Wednesday, January 15, 8:15

Draw 5
Wednesday, January 15, 15:45

Draw 6
Thursday, January 16, 8:15

Draw 7
Thursday, January 16, 15:45

Playoffs

Semifinal
Friday, January 17, 19:30

Final
Saturday, January 18, 13:00

References

External links
 

Quebec
Curling in Quebec
Sport in Abitibi-Témiscamingue
Val-d'Or
Quebec Scotties Tournament of Hearts
Quebec Scotties Tournament of Hearts